Remote Area Firefighting Team (RAFT) personnel are specialist members of the New South Wales Rural Fire Service or National Parks and Wildlife Service who are particularly effective for work in rugged, isolated areas that firefighting tankers can’t access by road. They can then be transported in 4WD before hiking to the fireground, or sometimes winched in by helicopter.

RAFTs are skilled in dry firefighting techniques such as creating firebreaks by cutting mineral earth trails or undertaking backburning work.

The winch training is just one aspect of the RAFT program which also includes a medical examination and fitness test to ensure crews can cope with this strenuous form of firefighting.

The ‘arduous pack test’ involves walking 4.83 km carrying 20 kg in 45 minutes or less.

Because RAFT operate a long way from vehicle support, RAFT personnel rely on each other, so teams are made up of people with a good mix of training, good navigational skills, and the ability to carry heavy equipment over long distances.

The team must be self-supporting, carrying food, drinking water and basic camping equipment.

Decisions to deploy RAFT are only made after thorough risk assessment with detailed analysis of current and predicted fire behaviour. The safety of crew members is paramount.

See also
 New South Wales
 Bushfires in Australia
 New South Wales Fire Brigades
 Firefighting
 Section 44 (New South Wales)
 Country Fire Service (South Australia)
 Country Fire Authority (Victoria)

References 

  2005 Media Releases
  ABC media article

External links
 NSW Rural Fire Service Website
 NSW Rural Fire Service Association
 NSW National Parks and Wildlife Service website 
 Fire and the Australian bush

New South Wales Rural Fire Service
Wildfire suppression